General Patterson may refer to:

Arthur Patterson (1917–1996), British Army major general
Francis E. Patterson (1821–1862), Union Army brigadier general
Grady Patterson (1924–2009), U.S. Air Force lieutenant general
L. Eric Patterson (fl. 1970s–2020s), U.S. Air Force brigadier general
Robert Patterson (1792–1881), Union Army major general
Thomas Patterson (Pennsylvania politician) (1764–1841), Pennsylvania Militia major general in the War of 1812

See also
John Paterson (New York politician) (1744–1808), Continental Army major general
Attorney General Patterson (disambiguation)